Eduardo Coelho may refer to:
 Eduardo Prado Coelho (1944–2007), Portuguese writer, journalist, columnist and professor
 Eduardo Teixeira Coelho (1919–2005), Portuguese comic book artist